The third season of The Secret Life of the American Teenager, an American television series created by Brenda Hampton, debuted on the ABC Family television network on Monday, June 7, 2010 at 8:00 PM. After its second season's mid-season premiere was successful, ABC Family announced on January 12, 2010, that the show would be renewed for a third season, consisting of 26 episodes, the most episodes in a season to date. Season 3 began with 14 episodes broadcast before going on a hiatus until March 2011.

Main cast 

 Shailene Woodley as Amy Juergens
 Kenny Baumann as Ben Boykewich
 Mark Derwin as George Juergens
 India Eisley as Ashley Juergens
 Greg Finley as Jack Pappas
 Daren Kagasoff as Ricky Underwood
 Megan Park as Grace Bowman
 Francia Raisa as Adrian Lee
 Steven R. Schirripa as Leo Boykewich
 Molly Ringwald as Anne Juergens

Episodes

References

External links
Official website

2010 American television seasons
3
2011 American television seasons